Some Head  is the first release by Thighpaulsandra. The CD was released via Coil's label Eskaton. The EP was limited to 1000 copies and was packaged in a black clamshell case.

Track listing

Personnel
Thighpaulsandra: synthesizers, piano, horn, vocals
John Balance: vocals, text
Hans-Jürgen Raüsch: "enforcement, retractors"

References
discogs.com entry

Thighpaulsandra albums
2000 EPs